6N or 6-N may refer to:

6N or 6°N, the 6th parallel north latitude
 Nordic Airways, IATA airline designator
 List of highways numbered 6N
U.S. Route 6N
U.S. Route 6  in New York
US 6N (NY), see  U.S. Route 209 in New York 
 Six Nations Championship, the annual northern hemisphere rugby union competition sometimes abbreviated as 6N
ER-6n, a model of Kawasaki Ninja 650R
Extrom 6N, see Caprolactam 
Typ 6N, internal corporate name for Volkswagen Polo Mk3
6N caves, see List of caves in Western Australia
6N, the production code for the 1984 Doctor Who serial Frontios

See also
N6 (disambiguation)